Friedrich Cornelius (2 July 1893 – 8 January 1976) was a German historian who specialized in ancient history.

Biography
Friedrich Cornelius was born in Munich, Germany, on 2 July 1893. He was the son of Hans Cornelius, grandson of Carl Adolph Cornelius, great-nephew of Peter Cornelius and great-great-nephew of Peter von Cornelius. He gained his Abitur at the Wilhelmsgymnasium in Munich in 1912, and subsequently studied history at the Ludwig Maximilian University of Munich. He was in the German Army during World War I, and gained his Ph.D. in history at Munich in 1919.

After gaining his Ph.D., Cornelius worked as a freelance writer for many years. He joined the Nazi Party in July 1930 and subsequently became Ortsgruppenleiter and Mayor of Garching bei München. He completed his habilitation on Roman history at the University of Würzburg in 1939 under the supervision of Alexander Schenk Graf von Stauffenberg. During World War II, Cornelius worked at the Institute for Research on the Jewish Question. During this time, Cornelius wrote a work on Erich Ludendorff and, with Walter Eckhardt, a multi-volume series on the early history of the Germanic peoples. Both works were banned in the Soviet occupation zone in the aftermath of the war.

After 1957, Cornelius lectured on the ancient history of the Near East at the Ludwig Maximilian University of Munich. Cornelius was well-known for having used cuneiform tablets to correctly estimate the years in which Hammurabi reigned. He was the author of a number of works which covered a diverse set of topics, including the histories of Ancient Greece, Ancient Rome, the Germanic peoples and the Hittites, and Germanic and Indo-European religion. Cornelius died in Schondorf am Ammersee, Germany, on 8 January 1976.

Selected works
 1925: Die Weltgeschichte und ihr Rhythmus. Ernst Reinhardt Verlag München
 1929: Die Tyrannis in Athen. Ernst Reinhardt Verlag München
 1932: Cannae: Das militärische und das literarische Problem (= Klio. Beihefte. volume 26). Dieterich, Leipzig
Schäffers Abriß aus Kultur und Geschichte. Verlag W. Kohlhammer Abteilung Schäffer Leipzig:
 1938: Abriß der Germanischen Götterlehre. Heft 10
 1942: Abriß der Germanischen Geschichte.
 1940: Untersuchungen zur frühen römischen Geschichte. Ernst Reinhardt Verlag München
 1942: Indogermanische Religionsgeschichte. Ernst Reinhardt Verlag München
 Schäffers Abriß aus Kultur und Geschichte, Abteilung I Geschichte; W. Kohlhammer Verlag Stuttgart und Köln:
 1950: Geschichte des Alten Orients, volume 3.
 1950: Griechische Geschichte. volume 4.
 1950: Römische Geschichte. volume 5.
 1950: Das Zeitalter des Absolutismus. volume 9.

 1959: Wilhelm Esch-Expedition nach Kleinasien
 1960: Geistesgeschichte der Frühzeit. I. Teil. Verlag E. J. Brill, Leiden
 1962: Geistesgeschichte der Frühzeit. II. Teil volume 1
 1967: Geistesgeschichte der Frühzeit. II. Teil volume 2
 1969: Mitarbeiter bei der deutschen Ausgabe des zweibändigen enzyklopädischen Werkes: Die Bibel und ihre WELT. Herausgegeben von Gaalyahu Cornfeld und Johannes Botterweck, Gustav Lübbe Verlag.
 1969: Die Glaubwürdigkeit der Evangelien (Philologische Untersuchungen) Ernst Reinhardt Verlag München/Basel
 1973: Geschichte der Hethiter. Wissenschaftliche Buchgesellschaft. Darmstadt

See also
 Franz Altheim

References

Sources

 Kurzbiografie bei: Werner Schubert, Werner Schmid, Jürgen Regge: Akademie für deutsches Recht, 1933–1945: Protokolle der Ausschüsse, volume 3, Familienrechtsausschuss, volume 3, S. 40.

1893 births
1976 deaths
German classical scholars
20th-century German historians
Germanic studies scholars
Indo-Europeanists
Ludwig Maximilian University of Munich alumni
Academic staff of the Ludwig Maximilian University of Munich
People from Munich
Scholars of Greek mythology and religion
Writers on Germanic paganism
German Army personnel of World War I